The Mandarin's Son (Сын мандарина in Cyrillic; Syn mandarina in transliteration) is comic opera in one act by César Cui, composed in 1859.  The libretto, which includes spoken dialogue, was written by Viktor Krylov.

No small influence for this work came from the French composer Daniel Auber, particularly his Le cheval de bronze, which had a similar setting, and was being performed in Saint Petersburg at the time.

Cui dedicated this opera to his bride, Mal'vina Bamberg.  (They had married the previous year.)  The orchestration is credited to Mily Balakirev.

Performance history

The first performance of The Mandarin's Son was "domestic," so to speak.  It occurred on 22 February 1859 at the apartment of Cui's in-laws in Saint Petersburg, with piano accompaniment.  The cast for this performance included Mussorgsky in the role of the Mandarin and Mal'vina as the Innkeeper's daughter.

The first public performance was given on 7 December 1878 in St. Petersburg, by the Клуб художников [Artists' Club].  Thereafter it proved to be one of the few operas by Cui that was popular in Imperial Russia.  Soon after the composer's death, however, the opera seemed to have disappeared from the repertory in Russia.  It was revived, however, in 1998 by the Pokrovsky Chamber Music Theater in Moscow in a modified production.

Roles

Synopsis
Place:At the Inn in China

The plot is very simple: The Innkeeper discovers that his daughter Iedi is interested in his servant Muri, whereupon he tells Muri to leave.  In the meantime, the Mandarin has arrived, searching for his long-lost son, who turns out to be -- of course -- Muri.

Bibliography
 Bernandt, G.B. Словарь опер впервые поставленных или изданных в дореволюционной России и в СССР, 1736-1959 [Dictionary of Operas First Performed or Published in Pre-Revolutionary Russia and in the USSR, 1836-1959]. Москва: Советский композитор, 1962, p. 288.
 Cui, César. Сын мандарина: комическая опера в одном действии [The Mandarin's Son:  comic opera in one act]. Ст.-Петербург: А. Битнер, 1859.
 ___.  Le fils du mandarin: opéra comique en un acte. Réduction pour chant et piano.  Leipzig:  Rahter, 1888.
 Krylov, V.A. "Композитор Ц.А. Кюи (отрывок из воспоминание)," Прозаические сочинения в двух томах,  т. 2  ["The Composer C.A. Cui (Fragment from Reminiscences)," Prose Works in Two Volumes, v. 2]. С. Петербург, 1908, pp. 289-300.
 Nazarov, A.F. Цезарь Антонович Кюи [Cezar' Antonovič Kjui]. Moskva: Muzyka, 1989.

Operas by César Cui
Operas
Russian-language operas